Pseudeuophrys erratica is a species of jumping spider (family Salticidae) that is distributed throughout Europe, although it is not common. P. erratica is normally found under the bark of trees or under rocks on forest fringes. The very similar looking P. lanigera is much more abundant, and is almost only found in or near buildings.

Description
Males reach a body length of three to four millimeters, with females up to five mm. Adults can be found in spring and summer, females also in autumn.

Distribution
P. erratica has a widespread distribution across Europe and Asia, and has been introduced to the United States. In the United States, it has been reported from Connecticut, New Jersey, New York, Massachusetts, Oregon, Pennsylvania, Rhode Island, and Vermont.

References

External links

 Diagnostic drawings of P. erratica

Salticidae
Spiders of Europe
Palearctic spiders
Spiders described in 1826